Jenns is a surname. Notable people with the surname include:

 Anne E. Jenns, British-born American plant pathologist
 Elizabeth Jenns (1911–1968), British actress

See also
Jenss
Jens (disambiguation)